This Mechanical Age is a 1954 American short documentary film about the early days of aviation, produced by Robert Youngson. In 1955, it won an Oscar for Best Short Subject (One-Reel) at the 27th Academy Awards.

References

External links

1954 films
1954 documentary films
1954 short films
American short documentary films
Live Action Short Film Academy Award winners
American black-and-white films
Warner Bros. short films
Documentary films about aviation
History of aviation
Films directed by Robert Youngson
1950s short documentary films
1950s English-language films
1950s American films